David Robertson Brown (August 28, 1869 – March 28, 1946) was a Canadian architect.

Early life and education
David Robertson Brown was born in Montreal on August 28, 1869, the son of James Brown and Elizabeth Robertson. He was educated at the High School of Montreal and then studied architecture for four years in Montreal under A. F. Dunlop.

Career
 
In 1890, Brown went to Boston, Massachusetts, where he worked for architectural firms, including Shepley, Rutan and Coolidge, heirs to the practice of Henry Hobson Richardson, before returning to Montreal in 1894 and forming the architectural firm of Brown, McVicar, and Heriot. From 1900 to 1905 he worked alone, then formed a temporary working partnership with Percy Erskine Nobbs, and finally in 1907 went into partnership with Hugh Vallance. Brown served as President of the Royal Architectural Institute of Canada and the Quebec Association of Architects.

Brown was a member of the Canada Club and the Royal St. Lawrence Yacht Club.

Personal life
In 1900 Brown married Harriet Fairbairn Robb, a daughter of William Robb, City Treasurer of Montreal.

He died at his home in Montreal on March 28, 1946.

Notable buildings
Board of Trade Building, Montreal
Medical Building of McGill University
Montreal Children's Hospital (1904)
Standard Shirt Building
Southam Building, Calgary (1912–13, demolished)
Memorial Gates, University of Saskatchewan (1927)

References

1869 births
1946 deaths
Canadian architects
High School of Montreal alumni